Omoo Peak is a  mountain summit in British Columbia, Canada.

Description

Omoo Peak is located in the Battle Range of the Selkirk Mountains. Precipitation runoff from the mountain drains north into Butters Creek and south into Houston Creek which are both tributaries of the Duncan River. Omoo Peak is more notable for its steep rise above local terrain than for its absolute elevation.

Etymology

The landform is named after Omoo, which was a Herman Melville novel published in 1847. In the novel, "Omoo" was a Tahitian native whose name meant "a person who wanders," and is from the dialect of the Marquesas Islands in French Polynesia in the South Pacific Ocean which is the setting for the book. The name was submitted by author/mountaineer Robert Kruszyna in 1972 and follows the Herman Melville-associated naming theme of the area established in 1958–59 by the Sam Silverstein-Douglas Anger climbing party. The mountain's toponym was officially adopted on October 3, 1973, by the Geographical Names Board of Canada.

Climate

Based on the Köppen climate classification, Omoo Peak is located in a subarctic climate zone with cold, snowy winters, and mild summers. Winter temperatures can drop below −20 °C with wind chill factors below −30 °C. This climate supports a small unnamed glacier on the north slope of the peak.

See also
Geography of British Columbia

Foremast Peak
Outrigger Peak

References

External links
 Omoo Peak: Weather forecast

Two-thousanders of British Columbia
Selkirk Mountains
Kootenay Land District